The Saudi rock gecko (Pristurus popovi) is a species of lizard in the family Sphaerodactylidae. The species is endemic to the Arabian Peninsula.

Etymology
The specific name, popovi, is in honor of Russian-British entomologist George Basil Popov.

Geographic range
P. popovi is found in Saudi Arabia and Yemen.

Habitat

Reproduction
P. popovi is oviparous.

References

Further reading
Arnold EN (1982). "Reptiles of Saudi Arabia. A new semaphore gecko (Pristurus: Gekkonidae) and a new dwarf snake (Eirenis: Colubridae) from southwestern Arabia". Fauna of Saudi Arabia 4: 468–477. (Pristurus popovi, new species).
Arnold EN (2009). "Relationships, evolution and biogeography of Semaphore geckos, Pristurus (Squamata: Sphaerodactylidae) based on morphology". Zootaxa 2060: 1-21.
Rösler H (2000). "Kommentierte Liste der rezent, subrezent und fossil bekannten Geckotaxa (Reptilia: Gekkonomorpha)". Gekkota 2: 28–153. (Pristurus popovi, p. 106). (in German).
Sindaco R, Jeremčenko VK (2008). The Reptiles of the Western Palearctic. 1. Annotated Checklist and Distributional Atlas of the Turtles, Crocodiles, Amphisbaenians and Lizards of Europe, North Africa, Middle East and Central Asia. (Monographs of the Societas Herpetologica Italica). Latina, Italy: Edizioni Belvedere. 580 pp. .

Pristurus
Reptiles described in 1982